Thoughts of My Cats is a 1954 non-fiction book by Scottish writer Bruce Marshall.

Synopsis
It is the story of the cats who adopted the Marshalls' villa at Cap d'Antibes when their less loving owners departed at the end of the season minus their pets.

The book has engaging photographs of the author and his feline family, and is a delightful and witty treatise on how to win --- and influence --- cats.

References

1954 non-fiction books
Books by Bruce Marshall
Constable & Co. books